Nano is an international peer-reviewed scientific journal published by World Scientific, covering recent developments and discussions in the field of nanoscience and technology. Topics covered include nanomaterials, characterization tools, fabrication methods, numerical simulation, and theory.

Established in 2006, the journal started as bimonthly, switched to 8 issues per year in 2014, and to monthly in 2016. The 2020 Impact Factor of the journal was 1.556.

Abstracting and indexing 
The journal is abstracted and indexed in the Science Citation Index Expanded, ISI Alerting Services, Materials Science Citation Index, Current Contents/Physical, Chemical & Earth Sciences, and Inspec.

See also

External links 
 

Publications established in 2006
Materials science journals
World Scientific academic journals
English-language journals
Bimonthly journals
Nanotechnology journals